The Empire Fire was a wildfire that burned in Yosemite National Park in California in the United States. The fire was reported on August 1, 2017 and was caused by lightning. It burned , before it was fully contained on November 27. The fire affected recreational activities in the national park.

The fire

The Empire Fire was reported on August 1, 2017 at 8:45 AM. It is located east of Badger Pass Ski Area and next to Bridalveil Creek Campground in Yosemite National Park. The fire was naturally caused, possibly by lightning. It was fueled by red fir timber, dormant brush, green leaf manzanita, chinquapan brush, and dead and down material.

On November 27, the fire was reported to be 100% contained.

See also
Railroad Fire

References

2017 California wildfires
History of Mariposa County, California
Wildfires in Mariposa County, California
Yosemite National Park